Lago is a station on Line 10 of the Madrid Metro. It is located in fare Zone A.

With its neighbor Batán to the south, Lago is one of only two above-ground stations on Line 10.

References 

Line 10 (Madrid Metro) stations
Railway stations in Spain opened in 1961